Shayegan may refer to:
Shayegan, Iran, a village in Kermanshah Province, Iran
Ali Shayegan (1903–1981), Iranian politician
Dariush Shayegan (1935–2018), Iranian thinker